Gayle Gardner (born ca. 1950) is an American sportscaster who worked for ESPN and NBC Sports beginning in 1987 until 1993. Gardner is considered a pioneer in sports broadcasting, having been the first female sports anchor to appear weekly on a major network.

Career
After being hired by ESPN in 1983, Gardner served as a SportsCenter anchor for three years. Gardner then worked for NBC from 1987-1993. Among the assignments that she undertook included anchoring NBC's New Year's Day college football bowl game coverage, NFL Live!, Major League Baseball: An Inside Look, NBC's 1988 and 1992 Summer Olympics coverage, the French Open, Wimbledon, and NBC's "Prudential Sports Updates".

In January, 1989, Gardner was a member of the NBC broadcast team for Super Bowl XXIII (San Francisco vs. Cincinnati).

On August 3, 1993, Gardner became the first woman to do televised play-by-play of a baseball game when she called the action of a game between the Colorado Rockies and the Cincinnati Reds.

Gardner later worked on the Food Network before writing a screenplay. She spent three years on the Food Network.

In 2004 (to celebrate the 25th anniversary of SportsCenter), Gardner returned to anchor a special "old school" edition of SportsCenter alongside Stuart Scott.

See also
Women in baseball

References

External links

1950 births
Living people
Olympic Games broadcasters
American television reporters and correspondents
Women sports announcers
American television sports announcers
Major League Baseball broadcasters
Colorado Rockies announcers
National Football League announcers
Tennis commentators
College football announcers
American women television journalists
21st-century American women